Mouilleron-en-Pareds is a former commune in the Vendée department in the Pays de la Loire region in western France. On 1 January 2016, it was merged into the new commune of Mouilleron-Saint-Germain. It is in the arrondissement of Fontenay-le-Comte.

It is known as the place of birth of Charles-Louis Largeteau (who contributed to the establishment of the Greenwich Meridian), Georges Clemenceau (head of the French government during World War I and who signed the Treaty of Versailles with Lloyd George, Vittorio Emanuele Orlando and Woodrow Wilson) and Marshal Jean de Lattre de Tassigny (who led the French First Army during the liberation of France with the Allied forces in 1945).

See also
Communes of the Vendée department

References

External links

Museum of Deux Victoires

Georges Clemenceau
Former communes of Vendée